Trolls is a 2016 American computer-animated jukebox musical comedy film produced by DreamWorks Animation and distributed by 20th Century Fox, based on the Good Luck Trolls dolls created by Thomas Dam. The film was directed by Mike Mitchell and co-directed by Walt Dohrn, from a screenplay by the writing team of Jonathan Aibel and Glenn Berger, based on a story by Erica Rivinoja. It stars the voices of Anna Kendrick, Justin Timberlake, Christopher Mintz-Plasse, Zooey Deschanel, Christine Baranski, Russell Brand, James Corden, Jeffrey Tambor, John Cleese, and Gwen Stefani. The film follows two trolls who go on a quest to save their village from destruction by the Bergens, creatures who eat Trolls to be happy.

Trolls premiered at the BFI London Film Festival on October 8, 2016, and was theatrically released in the United States on November 4, by 20th Century Fox. The film received generally positive reviews from critics and grossed $346 million worldwide against its $125 million budget. It received an Academy Award nomination for Best Original Song for "Can't Stop the Feeling!".

A sequel, Trolls World Tour, was released on April 10, 2020, with a third film set for release on November 17, 2023.

Plot

The Trolls are small, colorful, perpetually-happy creatures who sing, dance, and hug all day. They are discovered by the gigantic, ugly, and miserable Bergens, who believe they can only feel happy by consuming a Troll. The Bergens imprison the Trolls in a caged tree, and eat them every year on a special occasion, Trollstice. On the year that Prince Gristle Jr., son of King Gristle Sr., is due to eat his first troll, the chef in charge of the ceremony discovers that the Trolls' leader, King Peppy, has taken his infant daughter, Princess Poppy, and his people and organized an escape. King Gristle Sr. banishes Chef, and she vows to find the trolls, while secretly plotting to overthrow the monarchy as revenge for her exile.

Twenty years later, an adult Poppy organizes a gigantic party to celebrate the anniversary of the escape. A serious, grey, survivalist male troll named Branch warns that this could compromise their position, but everyone ignores him. His warnings come true when Chef follows the lights and noise and kidnaps Poppy's best friends, along with her love interest, a "zen" troll named Creek. While the rest cower in Branch's survival bunker, Poppy sets off alone to rescue her friends. She gets herself into several potentially deadly situations and is finally rescued by Branch, who thinks the quest is hopeless and reluctantly followed her to escape his crowded bunker.

Upon arrival in Bergen Town, Poppy and Branch see Gristle Jr. now king. Chef serves Creek to the King, who appears to eat him, but Poppy still holds out hope Creek is alive, and finds the rest of the trolls guarded by a young scullery maid named Bridget. Learning that Bridget is secretly in love with Gristle Jr., Poppy and the trolls agree to help her get a date in exchange for her help in ascertaining if Creek is alive. When Branch refuses to sing along with the rest in the ensuing musical number, he and Poppy argue, and he reveals that he has refused to sing ever since his singing drew the attention of Chef, who found his home and ate his grandmother when she tried to protect him. His color turned from blue to grey that day from the guilt.

Poppy comforts him with a hug, and the trolls disguise Bridget as "Lady Glittersparkles". She and Gristle Jr. go on a date at a roller rink/arcade restaurant, and Poppy spots Creek held captive in a jewel on Gristle's mantle. After the date, the trolls go to Gristle's room and attempt to free Creek, but discover the jewel is empty. Chef arrives and recaptures them, and Poppy is horrified to learn that Creek, in exchange for his own survival, has betrayed them all to Chef. He steals Poppy's cowbell and uses it to summon the rest of the trolls, whom Chef captures and places in a pot intended to be served at the feast. Poppy and the other trolls fall into despair, and turn gray.

Branch, given a change of heart, sings "True Colors" to cheer her up. Poppy reciprocates his feelings and sings along, and all the trolls, including Branch, regain their colors. Bridget, unwilling to see harm come to the trolls, releases them while Chef is not looking. Poppy, knowing how the angry Bergens will react, refuses to allow Bridget to sacrifice herself. The trolls return and explain to the Bergens that Lady Glittersparkles is actually Bridget, and that she and Gristle are already happy being in love with one another.

The trolls show the Bergens they too can find happiness inside themselves, bringing joy to Bergen Town. Chef refuses to surrender, and she and Creek are put on a flaming serving cart and sent rolling out of Bergen Town into the woods. Back home, Poppy is made Queen of the Trolls and begins a relationship with Branch. Creek and Chef find themselves on the top of a hill. Chef attempts to eat Creek, but the hill, which is actually a monster, eats them.

Cast

 Anna Kendrick as Princess Poppy, the sweet and optimistic princess (later queen) of the Trolls.
 Iris Dohrn as Baby Poppy
 Justin Timberlake as Branch, an over-cautious, unpleasant and cynical survivalist Troll who hates singing, dancing, hugging and also music, after he turned gray.
 Liam Henry as Young Branch
Christopher Mintz-Plasse as King Gristle Jr., son of Gristle Sr. He is the second King of the Bergens.
Zooey Deschanel as Bridget, a kind-hearted Bergen who works as a scullery maid to Chef.
Christine Baranski as Chef, the sadistic, cruel and power-hungry chef of the Bergens.
Russell Brand as Creek, a supposedly "zen" troll who is actually a cowardly traitor.
 James Corden as Biggie, a large, friendly Troll, and the owner of Mr. Dinkles.
 Jeffrey Tambor as King Peppy, the King of the Trolls and Poppy's father.
 John Cleese as King Gristle Sr., Gristle Jr's father and the first King of the Bergens.
 Gwen Stefani as DJ Suki, a Troll who uses DJ equipment made of insects.
 Ron Funches as Cooper, a giraffe-like Troll who raps and plays the harmonica .
 Icona Pop as Satin and Chenille, twin fashionista Trolls who are conjoined by their hair.
 Kunal Nayyar as Guy Diamond, a glittery Troll with an auto-tuned voice.
 Quvenzhané Wallis as Harper, a Troll artist with heterochromia who paints with her hair.
 GloZell as Grandma Rosiepuff,  Branch's late grandmother who sacrificed herself when she and Branch were discovered by Chef. 
Dami Im voices the character in the Australian version. 
Susanna Reid voices the character in the UK version.
 Meg DeAngelis as Moxie Dewdrop, a dancing Troll. 
Connie Glynn voices the character in the UK version.
 Ricky Dillon as Aspen Heitz, a Troll skitterboarder. 
Greg James voices the character in the UK version.
 Kandee Johnson as Mandy Sparkledust, a Troll who designs and repairs treasures. 
Abbey Clancy voices the character in the UK version.
 Walt Dohrn as:
 Smidge, a small, inordinately strong female Troll with a masculine voice.
 Mr. Dinkles, Biggie's pet worm.
 Fuzzbert, a Troll whose legs are the only thing visible besides his hair.
 Cloud Guy, an anthropomorphic cloud.
 Grace Helbig as Cookie Sugarloaf, one of the Trolls. 
Carrie Hope Fletcher voices the character in the UK version.
 Mike Mitchell and Curtis Stone as Chad and Todd, two royal guards that work for the Bergen Royal Family.
 Rhys Darby as Bibbly, a Bergen shopkeeper of the Bib Store.
 Shawn C. Phillips as Robbie

Production

DreamWorks announced plans for a film based on the Troll toyline as early as 2010. This version was to be written by Adam Wilson and Melanie Wilson LaBracio. By 2012, Chloë Grace Moretz had already been cast in the female lead role and Jason Schwartzman was reported to have been offered the male lead. In September 2012, 20th Century Fox and DreamWorks Animation announced that the film with the working title Trolls would be released on June 5, 2015, with Anand Tucker set to direct the film, written by Wallace Wolodarsky and Maya Forbes.

By April 2013, DreamWorks Animation had acquired the intellectual property for the Trolls franchise from the Dam Family and Dam Things. Having "big plans for the franchise," DreamWorks Animation became the exclusive worldwide licensor of the merchandise rights, except for Scandinavia, where Dam Things remains the licensor. In May 2013, the film was pushed back for a year to November 4, 2016. The same month, DreamWorks Animation announced that Mike Mitchell and Erica Rivinoja has been hired as a director and screenplay writer to "reimagine" the film as a musical comedy, which would present the origin of the Trolls' colorful hair. On June 16, 2014, Anna Kendrick joined the cast to voice Poppy, a princess. On September 15, 2015, Deadline Hollywood reported that Justin Timberlake would voice a character named Branch. Timberlake previously worked with DreamWorks Animation as the voice of Arthur "Artie" Pendragon in Shrek the Third in 2007. The full cast announced their respective roles via announcements on Twitter on January 6, 2016.

Music

Justin Timberlake served as an executive producer for the film's music and released the original song "Can't Stop the Feeling!" in conjunction with "Hello Darkness" on May 6, 2016. The song reached No. 1 in the official charts of 17 countries, including the United States and Canada. In addition to Timberlake, the rest of the cast contributed to the film's soundtrack, which also features guest appearances from Earth, Wind & Fire and Ariana Grande. The soundtrack album was certified Platinum by the Recording Industry Association of America and the Australian Recording Industry Association.

Release
The film's opening premiere opened at the BFI London Film Festival Opening Celebration on October 8, 2016 as a special BFI presentation, and was theatrically released on November 4, 2016, in the United States by 20th Century Fox, and in the United Kingdom at an earlier date of October 21, 2016.

Marketing
The first teaser trailer for Trolls was officially unveiled online on January 28, 2016. The following day, it would make its theatrical debut with the opening of  Kung Fu Panda 3. On June 29, 2016, a second trailer was then released online.

DreamWorks spent an estimated $105 million promoting the film.

Home media
Trolls was released on Digital HD on January 24, 2017, and on DVD and Blu-ray on February 7, 2017. The film topped the home video sales chart for two consecutive weeks. From June 2017 to December 2018, the film is available on Netflix, the film is expected to return to the streaming platform after 4 years on December 7, 2022.

Reception

Box office
Trolls grossed $153.7 million in the US and Canada and $193.2 million in other countries for a worldwide total of $346.8 million, against a budget of $125 million. Deadline Hollywood calculated the film made a net profit of $19 million, when factoring together all expenses and revenues.

In the United States and Canada, Trolls was released alongside the releases of Doctor Strange and Hacksaw Ridge, and was projected to gross $35–40 million from 4,060 theaters in its opening weekend. On its first day, the film grossed $12.3 million (including $900,000 made from Thursday night previews). It went on to open to $46.5 million, finishing second at the box office behind Doctor Strange.

Critical response
On review aggregator website Rotten Tomatoes, the film holds an approval rating of 75% based on 165 reviews, with an average rating of 6.30/10. The site's critical consensus reads: "Trolls brings its instantly recognizable characters to the big screen in a colorful adventure that, while geared toward the younger set, isn't without rewards for parents." On Metacritic, which assigns a normalized rating, the film has a score of 55 out of 100, based on 32 critics, indicating "mixed or average reviews". Audiences polled by CinemaScore gave the film an average grade of "A" on an A+ to F scale, while PostTrak reported filmgoers gave it an 80% overall positive score.

Lindsey Bahr of Associated Press gave the film a positive review and said, "Ultimately, the 'get happy' moral of the story, while trite compared to something like Inside Out, is sufficiently sweet enough for its audience. Did you expect more from a piece of candy?" Bill Zwecker of Chicago Sun-Times gave the film three-and-a-half stars out of four and said, "You simply will walk out – or perhaps dance out – of the theater feeling very happy yourself." Andy Webster of The New York Times said, "Exuberant, busy and sometimes funny, DreamWorks Animation's Trolls is determined to amuse."

Michael Rechtshaffen, writing for The Hollywood Reporter, called the film "an admittedly vibrant-looking but awfully recognizable animated musical comedy concoction." Alonso Duralde of TheWrap said the film "combines the barely-there characterization and irritating cutesiness of The Smurfs with the hideous character design and awful pop covers of Strange Magic." Betsy Bozdech of Common Sense Media gave the movie 4 stars. She said, "Make no mistake: Kids are going to love this movie. Trolls is cute, it's colorful, it has tons of catchy songs, and the messages are positive and easy to understand (happiness is inside everyone, if you know where/how to find it, and you shouldn't have to change who you are to get someone to like you)."

Accolades

Regarding music award shows, only film-related categories are included on this list.

Franchise

DreamWorks Trolls: The Experience was the first of multiple mobile pop-up attractions Feld Entertainment and Universal Brand Development had agreed to develop in April 2018. The pop-up attraction opened in New York City on October 22, 2018.

Sequel 

On February 28, 2017, Universal Pictures, the studio's new distributor and parent company since 2016, and DreamWorks Animation announced that a sequel titled Trolls 2 would be released on April 10, 2020, with Kendrick and Timberlake reprising their roles of Poppy and Branch as well as Aibel and Berger returning to write the script. On October 4, 2017, the release date for the sequel was moved up to February 14, 2020, as Fast & Furious 9 took its original April 10, 2020 slot. Along with the new release date, it was announced that Dohrn will be returning to direct and Shay will return to produce the sequel. On December 6, 2017, the film was pushed back to an April 17, 2020 release. On March 4, 2020, No Time to Die got delayed, so the film was pushed to an April 10, 2020 release again.

In May 2018, it was confirmed that Sam Rockwell, Chance the Rapper, Anthony Ramos, Karan Soni, Flula Borg, and Jamie Dornan joined the cast. Corden, Icona Pop, Funches, Stefani and Nayyar will also reprise their roles. In October 2018, it was confirmed that Kelly Clarkson had joined the cast, and will perform an original song.

A new title for the sequel, Trolls World Tour, was announced in June 2018. In May 2017, podcasters Justin, Travis and Griffin McElroy began campaigning for roles in the film via a podcast titled "The McElroy Brothers Will Be in Trolls 2" (later renamed "The McElroy Brothers Will Be in Trolls: World Tour" after the sequel's subtitle was revealed). Following the podcast's popularity, DreamWorks confirmed in September 2018 that the McElroy brothers would make cameo appearances in World Tour.

In June 2019, along with promotional posters, new cast members had been announced, which included: J Balvin, Mary J. Blige, Rachel Bloom, George Clinton, Ester Dean and Gustavo Dudamel.

Television specials

Trolls Holiday is a half-hour television special that aired on November 24, 2017 on NBC. Poppy realizes that the Bergens have no holidays to celebrate. She enlists Branch and their friends (the Snack Pack) to show their best friend Bridget and other Bergens the importance of holidays. Most of the original cast (including Kendrick, Timberlake, Deschanel, Mintz-Plasse, Corden, Funches, Nayyar and Dohrn) all reprise their roles from the film. The likely-Christmas Special is also directed by Crawford and written by Josh Bycel & Jonathan Fener with music by Jeff Morrow. Its soundtrack album that features seven songs was released on October 27, 2017. It is now available on Netflix and on DVD by Universal Pictures Home Entertainment. The bonus features of the DVD also include one episode of Spirit Riding Free and two of Home: Adventures with Tip & Oh.

A second special, Trolls: Holiday in Harmony, aired on November 26, 2021.

Animated series

A 52-episode animated series based on the film, entitled Trolls: The Beat Goes On! that airs on Netflix premiered on January 19, 2018 and ran for 8 seasons. The show stars Amanda Leighton as Poppy, Skylar Astin as Branch, and Funches who is reprising his role as Cooper, and Dohrn reprising his role as Cloud Guy.

Following the release of Trolls World Tour, another animated series, titled Trolls: Trollstopia, was released on Peacock and Hulu in 2020.

References

External links

 
 Dreamworks Trolls Party
 
 
 
 

 
2016 films
2016 3D films
2016 computer-animated films
2010s American animated films
2010s fantasy comedy films
2010s musical comedy films
2010s musical comedy-drama films
2010s children's animated films
20th Century Fox animated films
American 3D films
American children's animated comedy films
American children's animated fantasy films
American children's animated musical films
American computer-animated films
American fantasy comedy films
American musical comedy films
American musical comedy-drama films
American romantic comedy films
American romantic musical films
Children's comedy-drama films
Animated buddy films
Films about trolls
Films adapted into television shows
Films based on toys
Jukebox musical films
DreamWorks Animation animated films
Films scored by Christophe Beck
Films directed by Mike Mitchell
Films with screenplays by Jonathan Aibel and Glenn Berger
20th Century Fox films
2016 animated films
2016 comedy films
Animated films about friendship
Animated films based on Norse mythology
2010s English-language films